The Battle of Ramree Island (Burmese:ရမ်းဗြဲကျွန်း တိုက်ပွဲ, (also called Operation Matador) took place from 14 January to 22 February 1945, in the Second World War as part of the offensive on the Southern Front in the Burma campaign by the XV Indian Corps.

During the Invasion of Burma in early 1942, the Island had been captured by the Imperial Japanese Army. In January 1945, forces of the Indian XV Corps landed on Ramree and the neighbouring island of Cheduba, to establish airfields for the supply of the mainland campaign.

The battle is known for claims that hundreds of Japanese soldiers were killed by crocodiles in the mangrove swamps of Ramree. Some editions of the Guinness Book of World Records have attributed the highest number of fatalities in an animal attack to the battle; zoologists and modern military historians have dismissed these claims.

Background
A plan was ready by 2 January, when it was clear that the advance of the Fourteenth Army (Lieutenant-General William Slim) into Central Burma would soon pass beyond the range of its airbases at Imphal and Agartala; replacements at Chittagong, Akyab and Ramree would be needed.

On 14 January, the 26th Indian Division was ordered to attack Ramree on 21 January, as a Royal Marine detachment from 3 Commando Brigade occupied the neighbouring Cheduba Island. The Japanese garrison of Ramree consisted of the II Battalion, 121st Infantry Regiment (Colonel Kan'ichi Nagazawa), part of the 54th Division, with artillery and engineer detachments to act as an independent force.

Prelude

The battle started with Operation Matador, an amphibious assault to capture the strategic port of Kyaukpyu at the north end of Ramree Island and the airfield near the port, south of Akyab across Hunter's Bay. The invasion force was led by three Joint Assault Commanders, Captain Bush RN, Major-General Cyril Lomax and Wing Commander H. Smith.

The large number of ships was intended to provide more firepower in support of the landing force. Phoebe also joined the bombardment, along with Consolidated B-24 Liberators, North American B-25 Mitchells and Republic P-47 Thunderbolts of 224 Group Royal Air Force (RAF), under the command of HQ RAF Bengal and Burma, that strafed and bombed the beaches.

Battle

The assault troops were slightly delayed when a motor launch and a landing craft struck mines but landed unopposed on the beaches west of Kyaukpyu at  securing the beachhead by the afternoon. The following day, the 4th Indian Infantry Brigade (Brigadier J. F. R. Forman) landed, took over the beachhead and occupied Kyaukpyu. On 23 January, the 71st Infantry Brigade advanced southwards, down the west coast. Two days later Mayin was occupied and the troops reached the Yanbauk Chaung the next day. Resistance at the chaung from the troops of the II Battalion, 121st Regiment increased and on 31 January, the 71st Brigade was ordered to move inland, north-east towards Sane, then head south towards Ramree town. The 4th Brigade was to keep the defenders at Yanbauk Chaung under pressure and follow up vigorously should they retire.

On Ramree, the Japanese garrison resisted with great determination but on 1 February, the 71st Indian Infantry Brigade reached Sane and parts of the 36th Indian Infantry Brigade, from reserve, took Sagu Kuyun Island and relieved the marines on Cheduba Island. When the British outflanked a Japanese stronghold, the  abandoned the base and marched to join a larger force of Japanese soldiers across the island. The route took the Japanese through  of mangrove swamp and as they struggled through it, the British encircled the area. Trapped in deep mud-filled land, tropical diseases soon started to afflict the soldiers, as did scorpions, tropical mosquitoes and saltwater crocodiles.

On 7 February, the 71st Indian Infantry Brigade and supporting tanks reached the town of Ramree and encountered determined Japanese resistance. The 4th Indian Infantry Brigade had advanced to Ledaung Chaung and then moved east to reinforce the attack; the town fell on 9 February. A Japanese air raid on 11 February seriously damaged a destroyer with a near miss and forty small craft were sent by the Japanese from the mainland to rescue the survivors of the garrison. Japanese resistance on the island ended on 17 February and the Allied blockade was maintained until 22 February, sinking many of the rescue craft and inflicting many casualties on the Japanese troops hiding in the mangrove swamps; about  managed to get away. Cheduba Island was not garrisoned and the 22nd East African Brigade was sent to hold Ramree Island.

Aftermath

Analysis
In 1965, the British official historian, Stanley Woodburn Kirby, wrote that the Japanese defence of the island and the escape of about  against "fearful odds", had been courageous and determined. It took until 16 April for the airfield to be used for transport sorties, Akyab having come into use on 1 April. It had been vital to complete the occupation of Ramree Island quickly, as Operation Dracula against Rangoon needed to commence in the first week of May at the latest, to have a chance of finishing before the monsoon. The experience in co-operation between the 26th Indian Division and the navy in the war of chaungs and small ports along the Arakan coast was intended to be exploited in the attack. An estimate put naval gunfire support from 4 January to 13 March for the land operations at Akyab, Ramree and Cheduba at  The navy also carried    of stores and

Casualties
In the 1965 edition of the British official history, Stanley Woodburn-Kirby wrote that the Japanese force suffered about 500 men killed and twenty men taken prisoner; British losses were "trifling".

Alleged crocodile attacks
On Feb. 24, 1945, Reuters war correspondents reported that Japanese soldiers trying to escape Ramree island were "being forced by hunger out of the mangrove swamps and many have been killed by crocodiles." In his 1962 collection Wildlife Sketches Near and Far, Canadian naturalist and veteran of the Burma campaign Bruce Wright described the events of the battle, focusing on predation of the Japanese soldiers by the saltwater crocodiles.

Other writers, including Roger Caras in his 1964 Dangerous to Man, repeated Wright's version, with Caras stating "had the story come from a source other than Bruce Wright, I would be tempted to discount it". The story was incorporated into the Guinness Book of World Records as the worst animal attack ever recorded, due to Wright's statement that "[o]f about one thousand Japanese soldiers that entered the swamps of Ramree, only about twenty were found alive."

The presence of crocodiles in the Ramree swamps led other servicemen stationed on the island to believe they were a significant factor in the battle's outcome, with one British soldier writing in his diary that "[w]hen the Army landed they drove the Japanese into the swamps and the crocodiles killed hundreds of them. They used to call the crocodiles the allies." In his memoir, An Odyssey in War and Peace, Lieutenant-General Jack Jacob (Indian Army) recounted his experiences during the battle,

In 2006, Robert Duff, a veteran of the 26th Division, recorded an oral history for the BBC, stating, "after a few weeks we managed to push [the Japanese] to the swamp on the other side of the island, which was full of crocodiles. They decided to take their chances in the swamp rather than surrender. Only a handful came out alive".

In his 2011 analysis of the Burma campaign, historian Frank McLynn challenged this interpretation, saying,

In 1974, journalist George Frazier reported having asked the Japanese War Office about the crocodile attack and being told that they could not confirm that it had happened. In 2016, historian Sam Willis reported having found documentation indicating that the Japanese soldiers mostly drowned and/or were shot, and that crocodiles scavenged on their corpses afterwards.

In 2000, herpetologist Steven Platt  visited Ramree Island, where he interviewed residents who had been alive during the war and who had been forced into slave labor by the Japanese; they "unanimously discounted any suggestion that large numbers of Japanese fell prey to crocodiles". Ultimately, he stated, "[t]he only crocodile-related deaths occurred when 10 to 15 soldiers were killed trying to ford Min Chaung, a tidal creek", and he therefore concluded that although the deaths of nearly 1,000 Japanese soldiers during the Battle of Ramree Island are "well documented and undisputed", there is "little need to invoke crocodile predation".

Platt published a historiographical analysis of the allegations of the crocodile attack. He established that Bruce Wright had not been on Ramree Island at the time of the battle and noted that although the other chapters in Wright's book were told in the first person, the account of the battle was in the third person; possibly, Platt speculated, Wright was repeating stories he had been told by friends. Platt also noted that Wright did not actually "attribute the majority of Japanese casualties to crocodile predation" but wrote that only 20 out of 1,000 Japanese soldiers survived the battle, with crocodiles being "just one of many hazards".

Platt's findings are similar to sections of Wright's 1968 book, The Frogmen of Burma, which chronicled his experiences commanding the Sea Reconnaissance Unit (SRU) In the memoir, Wright described how he arrived on Ramree after the main battle concluded. Interviewing other members of the SRU, Wright reported that two of the men abandoned their paddleboards during the battle and climbed up a mangrove tree to avoid a crocodile. There, they "heard shouting and rifle fire during the night" far from the of Allied position; "vultures often appeared over areas [British] forces had never reached…." Wright concluded the Japanese did not die from crocodiles alone but also from "thirst" and "wounds".

Footnotes

References 

Books
 
 
 
 
 
 
 
 
 

Journals

Further reading

External links

 Bruce Stanley Wright, 17 September 1912 – 19 April 1975

Ramree Island
Ramree Island
Deaths due to crocodile attacks
Ramree Island
1945 in Burma
Naval battles of World War II involving the United Kingdom
Ramree Island
January 1945 events in Asia
February 1945 events in Asia
Japan–United Kingdom military relations